Mixes is a 1992 remix album by the British band Transvision Vamp that was released on the MCA Records label in Japan on CD only. The album contains extended and remixed versions that originally appeared on a variety of formats together with exclusive mixes and rare US promotional releases.

The twenty-page booklet contains an essay in Japanese and the lyrics in both Japanese and English.

Track listing
"Baby I Don't Care" (Abigail's Party Mix) - 5:48 (Taken from the UK 12" single.)
"The Only One" (Extended Mix) - 5:54 (Taken from the UK 12" and CD singles)
"Landslide of Love" (Extended Version) - 4:57 (Taken from the UK 12" single)
"Born to Be Sold" (7" Version) - 3:43 (Taken from the UK 7" and cassette singles)
"(I Just Wanna) B with U" (The Nightripper Mix) - 4:52 (Taken from the UK 12" and CD single)
"If Looks Could Kill" (Voodoo Hipster Mix) - 6:34 * (Taken from the US promo CD single)
"Twangy Wigout" (Extended Version) - 8:01 (Previously unreleased)
"(I Just Wanna) B with U" (Alternative Single Mix) - 4:25 ** (Taken from the US promo CD singles) 
"(I Just Wanna) B with U" (Alternative 12" Mix) (6:00 (Taken from the US promo 12" single)  and promo maxi CD single)
"(I Just Wanna) B with U" (Club Mix) - 6:33 (Taken from the US promo 12" single and promo maxi CD single)
"(I Just Wanna) B with U" (Dub Mix) - 5:16 (Taken from the US promo 12" single and promo maxi CD single)

(*) Although this mix has an identical title to the one originally released on the UK 12" single, this is an entirely different remix.
(**) Two US promo CD singles for (I Just Wanna) B with U were issued, a one track version (CD45-1673) and a six track maxi version (CD45-1586).
"The Only One" (Extended Mix) is incorrectly titled as The Only One (Extended Version).
"Twangy Wigout" (Extended Version) is incorrectly titled as Twangy Wig-out (Extended Version)

Notes
The CD booklet contains a number of errors relating to remixing credits. These are:-

"(I Just Wanna) B with U" (The Nightripper Mix) is incorrectly credited to Tony Garcia. It should be credited to 'Sunsonic'.
The US promo mixes of "(I Just Wanna) B with U" are incorrectly credited to Sunsonic. They should be credited to 'Tony Garcia'.

References

Transvision Vamp albums
1992 remix albums
Universal Records remix albums
MCA Records remix albums
1992 compilation albums
Universal Records compilation albums
MCA Records compilation albums